Terpatuni was a region and family of the old Armenia c. 400–800.

Two rulers are known: Teodoros Terpatuni (c. 590) and Sargis Terpatuni (c. 598).

See also
List of regions of old Armenia

Early medieval Armenian regions